The surname Foster is a variation of the name Forster, meaning one who 'works in the forest'. It may also derive from the French forcetier, meaning 'maker of scissors'. 

In the 2010 United States Census, Foster ranked #99 in surname popularity.

Notable people with the surname "Foster" include

A
Abiel Foster (1735–1806), American religious leader and politician
A. Carville Foster (born 1932), American politician
Addison G. Foster (1837–1917), American businessman
Adriance S. Foster (1901–1973), American botanist
Adrianna Foster (born 1986), Mexican musician
Akeem Foster (born 1987), Canadian football player
Al Foster (born 1943), American jazz drummer
A. Lawrence Foster (1802–1877), American politician
Alexander Foster (rugby union) (1890–1972), Irish rugby union footballer
Alexandra Föster (born 2002), German rower
Alison Foster (born 1957), British judge
Allan Foster (1925–1987), Australian politician
Allen Foster (1887–1916), English footballer
Amos Foster (1880–1952), American football player
Ami Foster, American actress
Andrea Foster (born 1997), Guyanese runner
Andy Foster (politician) (born 1961), New Zealand politician
Andy Foster (sports commissioner) (born 1979), American athletic administrator
Angelique Foster, British politician
Ann Foster (1617–1692), English witch
Ann Foster (died 1674) (??–1674), English witch
Anna Foster (born 1979), English radio presenter
Anthony Foster (1705–1779), Irish politician
Anthony Foster (activist) (1953–2017), Australian activist
Antigone Foster, English-Australian recording artist
Arian Foster (born 1986), American football player
Arlene Foster (born 1970), Northern Ireland politician
Augustus Foster (1780–1848), British diplomat

B
Basil Foster (1882–1959), English actor and cricketer
Belinda J. Foster, American attorney
Bernard Foster (born 1931), British boxer
Bert Foster (1906–1942), Australian rules footballer
Bertha Foster (1881–1968), American academic administrator
Bertie Foster (1884–1959), English footballer
Billy Foster (1937–1967), Canadian auto racing driver
Blake Foster (born 1985), American actor
Bobby Foster (1929–2006), English footballer
Brandon Foster (born 1984), American football player
Bren Foster, Australian actor
Brenda Jefferson Foster (1955–2010), American witness
Brendan Foster (born 1948), British runner
Brenden Foster (1997–2008), American fundraiser
Brent Foster (born 1967), New Zealand athlete
Brent Foster (director) (born 1982), Canadian film director
Bruce Foster, American engineer
Bryson Foster, American activist
Bud Foster (born 1959), American football coach
Buddy Foster (born 1957), American actor

C
C. Allen Foster (born 1941), American lawyer
Carey Foster (1835–1919), English chemist
Carlton Foster (1826–1901), American businessman and politician
Caroline Rose Foster (1877–1979), American farmer
Carson Foster (born 2001), American swimmer
Cassius Gaius Foster (1837–1899), American judge
Cathy Foster (born 1956), British sailor
Cecil Foster (born 1954), Canadian writer
Cecil G. Foster (1925–2016), American pilot
Cheryl Foster (born 1980), Welsh football referee
Claiborne Foster (1896–1981), American actress
Clare Foster (born 1980), British actress
Clement le Neve Foster (1841–1904), British geologist
Clyde Foster (1931–2019), American scientist and mathematician
Colin Foster (born 1964), English footballer
Colin Foster (footballer, born 1952) (born 1952), English footballer
Corey Foster (born 1969), Canadian ice hockey player
C. Stephen Foster, American ophthalmologist
C. W. Foster (1866–1935), English clergyman

D
Dale Foster (born 1958), Australian rules footballer
Daren Foster (born 1966), English cricketer
Darryl Foster (born 1961), American activist
Daryl Foster (born 1938), Australian cricket coach
Dawn Foster (1986–2021), British journalist
D'Chrome Foster (born 1977), American singer
Defne Joy Foster (1975–2011), Turkish actress
DeShaun Foster (born 1980), American football player
Diane Foster (1928–1999), Canadian track athlete
Diane Foster (curler) (born 1955/1956), Canadian curler
Dianne Foster (1928–2019), Canadian actress
Dixon Foster (1888–1973), American athletic coach
D. J. Foster (born 1993), American football player
Dodshon Foster (1730–1793), English merchant
Donte Foster (born 1990), American football player
Dudley Foster (1925–1973), British actor
Duke Foster (1929–1973), American football player
Dwayne Foster, American football coach

E
Ebenezer Foster (??–1792), English judge
Eddie Foster (1887–1927), American baseball player
Eddie Foster (American football) (born 1954), American football player
Edith Dunham Foster (1864–1950), American filmmaker
Edna Foster (1900–??), American actress
Edwin Michael Foster (1917–2013), American microbiologist and food scientist
Eileen Foster, American corporate executive
Eleazer Foster (1841–1899), American lawyer
Eleazer Kingsbury Foster (1813–1877), American lawyer and politician
Elena Ochoa Foster (born 1958), Spanish art curator
Eliza Foster (1802–1888), English author
Eliza Clayland Tomlinson Foster (1788–1855), American settler
Elmer Foster (1861–1946), American baseball player
E. M. Foster, English novelist
Émilie Foster, Canadian politician
Emily Foster (1842–1897), New Zealand teacher
Emmanuel Foster (1921–1965), English footballer
Emory S. Foster (1839–1902), American general
Enid Foster (1895–1979), American sculptor
Enoch Foster (1839–1913), American judge
E. P. Foster (1848–1932), American entrepreneur
Ephraim H. Foster (1794–1854), American politician
Erin Foster, American writer
Ernest Foster (1873–1956), English cricketer
Eugie Foster (1971–2014), American columnist
Evelyn Foster (1902–1931), English taxi driver
Ezola Foster (1938–2018), American activist

F
Fiona Foster, British television journalist
Foz Foster (born 1960), English composer
Frances Foster (1924–1997), American actress
Fred Foster (1931–2019), American record producer
Freddie Foster (born 1995), English cricketer
Frederic de Peyster Foster (1849–1929), American lawyer
Fredericka Foster (born 1944), American artist

G
G. C. Foster (1885–1966), Jamaican sportsman
Gene Foster (born 1942), American football player
Genevieve Foster (1893–1979), American illustrator
Geoffrey Foster (1884–1971), English cricketer
Gerald Foster (painter) (1900–1987), American painter
Gigi Foster, Australian economist
Gilbert Lafayette Foster (1874–1940), Canadian surgeon general
Giles Foster, English television director
Gillian Foster (born 1976), Australian footballer
Giraud Foster (1850–1945), American businessman
Glen Foster (1930–1999), American sailor
Glen Foster (comedian), Canadian comedian
Glenn Foster (1990–2021), American football player
Gloria Foster (1933–2001), American actress
Gordon Foster (1921–2010), Irish engineer
Graças Foster (born 1953), Brazilian businesswoman
Graeme Foster, Australian rugby league footballer
Grant Foster (born 1945), Australian composer
Gregory Foster (1866–1931), English academic administrator
Gwendolyn Audrey Foster (born 1960), American academic
Gwin Foster (1903–1954), American guitarist
Guy Mark Foster, American writer

H
Hadley Foster (born 1975), American athletics administrator
Hal Foster (1892–1982), Canadian-American comic writer
Hal Foster (art critic) (born 1955), American art critic
Hannah Webster Foster (1758/1759–1840), American novelist
Heather Foster (born 1966), Jamaican-American bodybuilder
Herman Foster (1928–1999), American pianist
Hubert Foster (1855–1919), British army officer
Hugh F. Foster Jr. (1918–2004), American general
Hunter Foster (born 1969), American entertainer

I
Idris Foster (1911–1984), Welsh scholar
Ira Roe Foster (1811–1885), American teacher and politician
Isaiah Foster (born 2003), American soccer player
Israel Moore Foster (1873–1950), American politician
Ivan Foster (born 1943), Northern Irish minister

J
Jabez Foster (footballer) (1902–??), English footballer
Jackie Foster (1903–1936), English footballer
Jacqueline Foster, British politician
Jacqueline Foster (bowls) (born 1975), Canadian lawn bowler
Jake Foster (born 1988), Australian rugby league footballer
Jarrey Foster (born 1996), American basketball player
Jason Foster (born 1988), American football player
Jayson Foster (born 1985), American football player
J. D. Foster (born 1953), American record producer
Jean Foster (born 1972), American sports shooter
Jeanne Robert Foster (1879–1970), American poet
Jeannette Howard Foster (1895–1981), American librarian
Jedediah Foster (1726–1779), English judge
Je'Kel Foster (born 1983), American basketball player
Jen Foster, American singer-songwriter
Jennifer Foster, English archaeologist
Jennifer Foster (equestrian) (born 1964), Canadian equestrian
Jerome Foster II (born 2002), American activist
Jerome Foster (American football) (born 1960), American football player
Jerry Foster (1907–1984), Scottish rugby union footballer
J. Morris Foster (1881–1966), American actor
Joana Foster (1946–2016), Ghanaian-British activist
Joanna Foster (born 1964), British actress
Jodie Foster (born 1962), American actress
Joel Foster (1814–1945), American farmer
Joey Foster (born 1982), British racing driver
Josephine Foster, American musician
Joshua L. Foster (1824–1900), American architect
Joy Foster, Jamaican table tennis player
Joyce Foster (born 1944), American politician
Judith Ellen Foster (1840–1910), American lecturer
Julia Foster (born 1943), English actress
Juliann Bluitt Foster (1938–2019), American dentist
Julie Foster (born 1969), Canadian rugby union footballer
Juliette Foster (born 1964), British television journalist

K
Kareem Foster (born 2000), Caymanian footballer
Karith Foster (born 1974), American comedian
Kathi Foster (born 1947), American politician
Kathryn Foster, American soap opera director
Keith Foster (born 1948), Jamaican singer
Kenny Foster (born 1985), American mixed martial artist
Kent Foster (born 1938), British military officer
Kitty Foster (1790–1863), American freed slave
Kmele Foster (born 1980), American entrepreneur
Kris Foster (born 1974), American baseball player
Krishna Foster (born 1970), American chemist
Kurtis Foster (born 1981), Canadian ice hockey player

L
Lafayette S. Foster (1806–1880), American politician and judge
Larry Foster (born 1976), American football player
Larry Foster (baseball) (born 1937), American baseball player
Laura E. Foster (1871-1920), American illustrator and cartoonist
Lawrence Foster (born 1941), American conductor
Leland Foster (1910–??), American baseball player
Leo Foster (born 1951), American baseball player
Leon Foster (1913–1991), Barbadian cricketer
Lewis Foster (born 1993), English rugby league footballer
Lewis R. Foster (1898–1974), American screenwriter
Lilibet Foster, American film director
Lillian Foster (??–1963), Canadian journalist
Linae Foster, American video game producer
Lindsay Foster (??–2020), Australian judge
Lisa Foster, Canadian actress
Little Willy Foster (1922–1987), American singer-songwriter
Lizzie Foster (1856–1948), British archer
Lori Foster, American writer
Lorraine Foster (born 1938), American mathematician
Louis Foster (born 2003), British racing driver
Lucas Foster, American film producer
Lucas Foster (snowboarder) (born 1999), American snowboarder
Lucia Foster, American economist
Lucian R. Foster (1806–1876), American photographer
Luke Foster (born 1985), English footballer
Luther H. Foster (1827–1876), American businessman
Luther H. Foster Jr. (1913–1994), American academic administrator
Lydia Mary Foster (1867–1943), Irish writer
Lyle Foster (born 2000), South African footballer
Lynn Foster (1914–1985), Australian playwright

M
M. A. Foster (1939–2020), American writer
Maalique Foster (born 1996), Jamaican footballer
Mac Foster (1942–2010), American boxer
Marcia Lane Foster (1897–1983), English artist
Marcus Foster (1923–1973), American educator
Marcus Foster (basketball) (born 1995), American basketball player
Margaretta Foster (1737–1824), Irish peeress
Margot Foster (born 1958), Australian rower
Marian Foster (born 1948), English television presenter
Marie Foster (1917–2003), American activist
Marion Foster (writer) (1924–1997), Canadian broadcaster
Martha M. Foster, American business executive
Marty Foster (born 1963), American baseball umpire
Mary-Jane Foster, American lawyer
Mason Foster (born 1989), American football player
Matt Foster (born 1995), American baseball player
Matthew Foster (born 2000), Irish cricketer
Matty Foster (born 2001), English rugby league footballer
Max Foster (born 1972), American news correspondent
Mayhew Foster (1911–2011), American soldier
Meg Foster, American actress
Megan Foster (born 1992), American rugby union footballer
Melvin Foster (born 1971), American boxer
Mercedes S. Foster (born 1942), American zoologist
Mo Foster (born 1944), English instrumentalist
Morris Foster (1936–2020), Irish cyclist
Morrison Foster (1823–1904), American business agent
Mulford B. Foster (1888–1978), American botanist
Muriel Foster (1877–1937), English soprano
Murphy J. Foster (1849–1921), American politician
Murray Foster (born 1967), Canadian musician
Myles Birket Foster (1825–1899), English painter

N
Nancilea Foster (born 1983), American diver
Nat Foster (1766–1840), American pioneer
Neal Foster (born 1972), American politician
Neil Foster (born 1962), English cricketer
Neville Foster (1890–1978), English cricketer
Nick Foster, British composer
Nick Foster (racing driver) (born 1965), British auto racing driver
Norris Foster (1855–1925), English barrister

O
Orpha Woods Foster (1850–1938), American pioneer
Otha Foster (born 1988), American football player
Owen Foster (born 2005), English footballer

P
Pat Foster (born 1939), American basketball coach
Patrick Foster (born 1987), Kenyan-English cricketer
Paulinus Foster (1811–1861), American lawyer and politician
Phil Foster (1913–1985), American actor
Phil Foster (politician) (born 1958), American politician
Philip Foster (1805–1884), American businessman
Philip Foster (British politician) (1865–1933), American politician
Phoebe Foster (1896–1975), American actress
Pop Foster (1878–1944), American baseball player
Pops Foster (1892–1969), American musician
Preston Foster (1901–1970), American actor

R
Radney Foster (born 1959), American musician
Ramon Foster (born 1986), American football player
Randolph Foster (athlete) (born 1968), Costa Rican sprinter
Randolph Sinks Foster (1820–1903), American bishop
R. E. Foster (1878–1914), English cricketer and footballer
Reb Foster (1936–2019), American disc jockey
Rebecca Salome Foster (1848–1902), American missionary
Red Dawn Foster, American politician
Reddy Foster (1864–1908), American baseball player
Reg Foster (1904–1999), British journalist
Renardo Foster (born 1984), American football player
Reuben Foster (born 1994), American football player
Rick Foster, American guitarist
R. L. Foster (1919–2005), American politician
Roberta Foster (born 1961), Barbadian equestrian
Robin B. Foster, American botanist
Rod Foster (born 1960), American basketball player
Rodney Foster (born 1941), English golfer
Roger Sherman Baldwin Foster (1857–1924), American lawyer
Ronnie Foster (born 1950), American musician
Rube Foster (1879–1930), American baseball player
Rube Foster (AL pitcher) (1888–1976), American baseball player
Rufus Edward Foster (1871–1942), American judge
Rusty Foster, American programmer
Ruth Foster (1920–2012), American actress
Ruthie Foster (born 1964), American singer-songwriter
Ryan Foster (born 1988), American runner
Rylee Foster (born 1988), Canadian soccer player

S
Sally Foster, Scottish archaeologist
Sesshu Foster (born 1957), American poet
Sewell Foster (1792–1868), Canadian politician
Shan Foster (born 1986), American basketball player
Shanise Foster (born 1993), Jamaican footballer
Shawn Foster, American television director
Sheri Foster (born 1957), American actress
Sidney Foster (1917–1977), American pianist
Stacie Foster, American actress
Stan Foster, American actor
Stanley Foster (1885–1965), New Zealand surgeon
Stella Foster, American journalist
Stephanie Foster (born 1958), American rower
Stephanie Foster (politician) (born 1967), American politician
Sue Foster, English snooker player
Susanna Foster (1924–2009), American actress
Sutton Foster (born 1975), American entertainer
Sydney Foster (1921–2007), Jamaican hurdler
Sydney F. Foster (1893–1973), American judge

T
Tameka Foster (born 1971), American fashion stylist
Terry Foster (born 1959), American sports columnist
Theodore Foster (1752–1828), American politician
Tiffany Foster (born 1984), Canadian equestrian
Tina Monshipour Foster, Iranian-American lawyer
Toby Foster (born 1969), British comedian
Todd Foster (born 1967), American boxer
Toni Foster (born 1971), American basketball player
Tony Foster (1853–1918), New Zealand lecturer
Tony Foster (artist) (born 1946), British environmentalist
Trevor Foster (1914–2005), Welsh rugby union footballer
Trevor Foster (drummer), English drummer

V
Vera Chandler Foster (1915–2001), American social worker
Vere Foster (1819–1900), English philanthropist
Veronica Foster (1922–2000), Canadian cultural figure
Vince Foster (1945–1993), American attorney
Vine Cynthia Colby Foster (1852–1878), American medical practitioner

W
Warren Foster (1904–1971), American writer
Wayne Foster (born 1963), English footballer
Wendell Foster (1924–2019), American politician
Wilder D. Foster (1819–1873), American politician
Wilfrid Foster (1874–1958), English army officer and cricketer
Winston Foster (born 1941), English footballer

Y
Yip Foster (1907–1978), Canadian ice hockey player

Disambiguation pages

A
Adrian Foster (disambiguation)
Alan Foster (disambiguation)
Alex Foster (disambiguation)
Alfred Foster (disambiguation)
Amy Foster (disambiguation)
Andrew Foster (disambiguation)
Arthur Foster (disambiguation)
Asa Foster (disambiguation)

B
Barry Foster (disambiguation)
Ben Foster (disambiguation)
Bill Foster (disambiguation)
Bob Foster (disambiguation)
Bradley Foster (disambiguation)
Brian Foster (disambiguation)

C
Catherine Foster (disambiguation)
Charles Foster (disambiguation)
Christopher Foster (disambiguation)
Craig Foster (disambiguation)

D
Daniel Foster (disambiguation)
David Foster (disambiguation)
Derek Foster (disambiguation)
Donald Foster (disambiguation)
Douglas Foster (disambiguation)
Dwight Foster (disambiguation)

E
Edward Foster (disambiguation)
Eric Foster (disambiguation)

F
Frank Foster (disambiguation)
Frederick Foster (disambiguation)

G
Gary Foster (disambiguation)
Geoff Foster (disambiguation)
George Foster (disambiguation)
Graham Foster (disambiguation)
Greg Foster (disambiguation)

H
Harold Foster (disambiguation)
Harry Foster (disambiguation)
Helen Foster (disambiguation)
Henry Foster (disambiguation)

I
Ian Foster (disambiguation)

J
Jack Foster (disambiguation)
James Foster (disambiguation)
Jane Foster (disambiguation)
Jeff Foster (disambiguation)
Jim Foster (disambiguation)
John Foster (disambiguation)
Jon Foster (disambiguation)
Joseph Foster (disambiguation)

K
Kate Foster (disambiguation)
Kathleen Foster (disambiguation)
Kathy Foster (disambiguation)
Kenneth Foster (disambiguation)
Kevin Foster (disambiguation)
Kimberly Foster (disambiguation)

L
Leroy Foster (disambiguation)
Linda Foster (disambiguation)

M
Margaret Foster (disambiguation)
Mark Foster (disambiguation)
Martin Foster (disambiguation)
Mary Foster (disambiguation)
Maurice Foster (disambiguation)
Michael Foster (disambiguation)

N
Nathaniel Foster (disambiguation)
Nigel Foster (disambiguation)
Norman Foster (disambiguation)

P
Paul Foster (disambiguation)
Peter Foster (disambiguation)

R
Ralph Foster (disambiguation)
Red Foster (disambiguation)
Reginald Foster (disambiguation)
R. F. Foster (disambiguation)
Richard Foster (disambiguation)
Robert Foster (disambiguation)
Ron Foster (disambiguation)
Roy Foster (disambiguation)

S
Samuel Foster (disambiguation)
Sarah Foster (disambiguation)
Scott Foster (disambiguation)
Stephen Foster (disambiguation)
Steve Foster (disambiguation)

T
Thomas Foster (disambiguation)
Timothy Foster (disambiguation)

W
Walter Foster (disambiguation)
Will Foster (disambiguation)
William Foster (disambiguation)

Fictional characters
Aidan Foster, a character on the soap opera Neighbours
Anne Foster, a character on the soap opera Coronation Street
Cassandra Foster, a character on the All My Children
Jonny Foster, a character on the soap opera Emmerdale
Snapper Foster, a character on soap opera The Young and the Restless

See also
Foster (given name), a page for people with the given name "Foster"
Foster (disambiguation), a disambiguation page for "Foster"
Forster (disambiguation), a disambiguation page for "Forster"
Attorney General Foster (disambiguation), a disambiguation page for Attorney Generals surnamed "Foster"
Doctor Foster (disambiguation), a disambiguation page for Doctors surnamed "Foster"
General Foster (disambiguation), a disambiguation page for Generals surnamed "Foster"
Governor Foster (disambiguation), a disambiguation page for Governors surnamed "Foster"
Justice Foster (disambiguation), a disambiguation page for Justices surnamed "Foster"
Lord Foster (disambiguation), a disambiguation page for Lord surnamed "Foster"
Senator Foster (disambiguation), a disambiguation page for Senators surnamed "Foster"

Notes

English-language surnames
Surnames of French origin